"LA Devotee" is a song by American rock band Panic! at the Disco. It was released as the first promotional single from the band's fifth studio album, Death of a Bachelor, on November 26, 2015 (Thanksgiving Day) through Fueled by Ramen and DCD2. The song was written by Brendon Urie, White Sea and Jake Sinclair and was produced by Sinclair.

Background
The song's inspiration derives from Urie's passion for Los Angeles and is about someone who has fallen in love with L.A. and will stop at nothing to survive and succeed in the city. A video of the audio for "LA Devotee" was uploaded to Fueled by Ramen's official YouTube channel on the day of its release, November 26, 2015. It has been streamed over 55 million times on YouTube and over 262 million times on Spotify as of December 2022.

Music video
The song's official music video was released September 22, 2016, starring Noah Schnapp, a child actor known for his role as Will Byers in the Netflix series Stranger Things. The video starts with a young girl played buy Anna Sachtleben nervously trying to cross a field with a dog barking in the background. The girl falls down and gets kidnapped by an unknown cloaked figure as the camera shows a shot of the mysterious "Join Us" logo cropped into the field. The next scene shows a young boy (Schnapp) being strapped to a chair singing the song while experiencing bizarre things, with Brendon also singing the song on a screen. The young girl also makes an appearance forcing the boy to drink a Eucharist. The last scene shows four cloaked figures strapping two mechanisms to the boy, causing him to be electrocuted and then suffer a seizure. Afterwards, the video ends with Brendon walking up to him with rubber gloves in a menacing manner. It is unknown what Brendon is to do next. 

Between shots of Schnapp being tortured, several disturbing images can be seen, including men with animal heads, blood poured over a skull, children with black holes for their eyes, and a symbol of the Church of Satan (featuring Baphomet's head inside an inverted pentagon) projected over Urie's face.

Other references
The song references multiple places in the Great Los Angeles area, including:
 Mulholland Drive
 Hollywood Shrine

Charts

Weekly charts

Year-end charts

Certifications

References

2015 singles
2015 songs
American power pop songs
Fueled by Ramen singles
Panic! at the Disco songs
Ska songs
Songs about Los Angeles
Songs written by Brendon Urie
Songs written by Jake Sinclair (musician)
Songs written by Morgan Kibby